Basle is an alternative name for Basel, Switzerland's third most populous city.

Basle may also refer to:

Basle, 1969, a 1996 jazz album

People with the surname
Charles Basle (1885–1962), French racecar driver

See also
Basel III
Basel (disambiguation)